Donald Simmons may refer to:

Don Simmons (politician) (1918–1986), Australian politician who sat in the South Australian House of Assembly
Donald C. Simmons Jr. (born 1963), American educator and historian
Don Simmons (ice hockey) (1931–2010), Canadian NHL goalie
Don Simmons (artist) (born 1973), Canadian artist and writer